This is a following list of the MTV Movie Award winners and nominees for Best Breakthrough Performance, first awarded in 1992. In 2010 and 2011, it was renamed Best Breakout Star. In 2012, it returned to its original name but was turned into a non-voting category, where an academy of outstanding directors honors a silver screen newcomer with extraordinary talent. In 2017, it was renamed Next Generation and was converted to a voting category.

From 1999 to 2005, and in 2009, it was split into two categories: Best Male Breakthrough Performance and Best Female Breakthrough Performance.

Winners and nominees

1990s

2000s

2010s

2020s

References

MTV Movie & TV Awards
Awards for young actors